Marco Antonio Delgado (born May 16, 1995), known as Mark Delgado or Marky Delgado, is an American professional soccer player who plays as a midfielder for Major League Soccer club LA Galaxy.

Early life
Delgado grew up watching his two older brothers soccer games and watching Liga MX games on television with his father. Delgado began playing soccer at the age of four with children two to three years older, after a coach saw him playing with a ball while at his older brother's soccer game. Delgado grew up playing in the Pomona United Youth Soccer League and when he was 14, switched to the Cosmos West Academy. The next year, he joined U.S. Soccer's U-17 residency program, spending two semesters before returning home.

In 2011, Delgado had established himself in the Southern California youth soccer scene and faced a difficult decision decided which Los Angeles-based MLS academy to join - Chivas USA or the LA Galaxy, ultimately deciding to join Chivas. After attending the Generation Adidas Cup with the Chivas academy, he was invited to the first team training. At age 16, he was playing with the Chivas U19 team and training with the MLS squad.

Club career

Chivas USA 

Delgado was signed by Chivas USA as a Home Grown Player on April 2, 2012. Delgado made his professional debut on October 4, 2012 during a 4–0 defeat to Vancouver Whitecaps FC, coming on as a 73rd-minute substitute.

Toronto FC 

After the folding of Chivas USA in November 2014, Delgado was selected by Toronto FC in the 2014 MLS Dispersal Draft.

He made his debut for Toronto FC in May 2015 in the 2015 Canadian Championship. On July 12, 2015, he scored his first goal for Toronto in a 4–4 draw against New York City FC at Yankee Stadium. On July 20, 2015, Delgado was named to the MLS Team of the Week.

Delgado was again named to the MLS Team of the Week on August 1 and August 22, 2016. On October 18, 2016, Delgado re-signed with Toronto FC on a multi-year deal.

LA Galaxy 
On January 21, 2022, Delgado was traded to return to his home state to play for LA Galaxy.

International career 

Delgado was born in the United States to Mexican parents, making him eligible to represent Mexico as well as the United States. At 13, he spent time with the U.S. U15 team and was part of the American U-17 residency program in Bradenton, Florida in 2010 and 2011. Delgado has represented the United States at the under-17, under-18 and under-20 levels. On January 8, 2018, Delgado received a call-up for the senior team for a friendly against Bosnia and Herzegovina.

He made his USMNT debut in a 1–0 friendly win against Paraguay on March 27, 2018. He started the match and helped win the decisive penalty, which was converted by Bobby Wood; he came off in the 86th minute for fellow senior team debutant Timothy Weah.

Career statistics

Club

International 

Source: US Soccer

Honors
Toronto
MLS Cup: 2017
Supporters' Shield: 2017
Canadian Championship: 2016, 2017, 2018
Eastern Conference (Playoffs): 2016, 2017, 2019

References

External links
 

1995 births
Living people
American expatriate soccer players
American soccer players
American sportspeople of Mexican descent
Association football midfielders
Chivas USA players
Expatriate soccer players in Canada
People from Glendora, California
Soccer players from California
Toronto FC players
Toronto FC II players
USL Championship players
United States men's international soccer players
United States men's under-20 international soccer players
United States men's youth international soccer players
Major League Soccer players
Homegrown Players (MLS)
LA Galaxy players